Phyllosticta erratica is a fungal plant pathogen infecting tea.

References

External links
USDA ARS Fungal Database

Fungal plant pathogens and diseases
Tea diseases
erratica